Ismail Johari (13 March 1947 - 16 July 2017) was the author of the Bukit Kepong novel published by Dewan Bahasa dan Pustaka (DBP) in 1990 and one of the main script writers of the Bukit Kepong film produced by Jins Shamsuddin in 1981, both of which were based on an actual armed incident that took place on 23 February 1950 between the Federation of Malaya Police and gunmen of the Malayan Communist Party during the Malayan Emergency. The Bukit Kepong novel was adopted as the Form 4 secondary school and Sijil Pelajaran Malaysia (SPM) educational teaching material.

Personal life 
Ismail, the second child out of five siblings was born and raised in Tanjung Karang, Selangor. His parents held various laborious jobs to provide Ismail and his siblings good education and a comfortable living. 

Ismail was a dedicated and committed police officer, holding various ranks during his 19-year service with the Royal Malaysia Police before pursuing a career as a private investigator and a fraud examiner. 

He died on 16 July 2017 at the age of 70.

References

External links
 Bukit Kepong by Ismail Johari - Goodreads

2017 deaths
1947 births
People from Selangor
Malaysian people of Malay descent
Malaysian Muslims
Malaysian police officers
Malaysian anti-communists
Malaysian writers
Malaysian novelists